Félix Pérez Cardozo is a district located in the Guairá Department of Paraguay.

References 

Populated places in the Guairá Department